Katuri Medical College & Hospital is one of the Private Medical colleges in Guntur, India, offering Postgraduate (Masters - MD/MS) and Undergraduate (Bachelors' - MBBS) courses in Medical Sciences. It is located on NH-5, towards Chilakaluripet, in the suburban area of Guntur south-west, at about 15 km from Guntur City.

Departments
The college is recognized by the Medical Council of India. It is affiliated to the NTR University of Health Sciences, Vijayawada, with collaboration and close links to the International Medical and Technological University.

Departments under services
Hospital (Clinical):
General medicine
Respiratory Medicine
Psychiatry
Dermatology
General Surgery
Neurosurgery
Orthopedics
Physiotherapy
Radiology
Oncology
Anesthesia
Pediatrics
OB&G
ENT
Ophthalmology
Dentistry

College (Non clinical & Para clinical):
Anatomy
Physiology
Biochemistry
Pharmacology
Microbiology
Pathology
Forensic Medicine
Community Medicine

References

External links

KMC website

Private medical colleges in India
Medical colleges in Andhra Pradesh
Colleges in Guntur
Educational institutions established in 1997
1997 establishments in Andhra Pradesh